Boismont amy refer to:

 Boismont, Meurthe-et-Moselle, a commune in the department of Meurthe-et-Moselle in France
 Boismont, Somme, a commune in the department of Somme in France
 Alexandre Jacques François Brière de Boismont, a French physician and psychiatrist.
 Nicolas Thyrel de Boismont, a French abbot